Else Højgaard (18 April 1906–11 July 1979) was a Danish ballerina and an actress of stage and screen. Noted for a fiery temperament and edgy intensity, Højgaard premiered as a solo ballerina for George Balanchine in 1931 and was the primary dancer for Harald Lander until 1942. Højgaard later went on to a long career as a dramatic actress, performing and teaching at the Royal Danish Theatre. She performed in radio and television, and played supporting roles in several films including the dark drama Café Paradis (1950). Højgaard was awarded a knighthood in the Order of the Dannebrog in 1961 and promoted to Knight 1st Class in 1971.

Ballet career
Else Højgaard (née Andreasen) was born on 18 April 1906 on Bornholm, Denmark, the daughter of a civil attorney. At the age of 12, Højgaard became a student at the Royal Danish Theatre ballet school in Copenhagen and graduated in 1929. She debuted in the role of Amelie in the 1928 production of Drømmebilleder and was chosen to perform the solo of Terpsichore in George Balanchine's 1931 staging of Apollon Musagete. Following that performance, Højgaard was a solo ballerina for the Royal Danish Ballet until her retirement from ballet performance in 1942. She was the primary dancer for Harald Lander's revival of the August Bournonville ballets. Known for a fiery temperament, she was noted for her highly dramatic and lyrical performances, lending a modern, anti-romantic presentation to her roles.

Acting career
While employed as a ballerina, Højgaard also attended the Royal Danish Theatre's drama school from 1932 to 1934 and made her stage debut in Anker Larsen's Son of Zeus (1935). She later performed as the dancer Arabella in the 1938 film musical Champagnegaloppen. However, it wasn't until she left the ballet in 1942 that Højgaard dedicated herself to acting and demonstrated a dramatic stage presence that was "independent", "indestructible", and "almost defiant." Noted performances included the Karen Blixen-like character of Julia in T.S. Eliot's The Cocktail Party and the emotional sister Irene in Søskende (1952). Højgaard performed in both radio and television, and she was an instructor for 16 years at the Royal Danish Theatre until 1967. In 1971, at the age of 65, Højgaard returned to ballet to perform the role of Old Woman in Dødens triumf (The Triumph of Death). In 1961, Højgaard was awarded knighthood in the Order of the Dannebrog and in 1972, she was promoted to Knight of the First Degree.

During a career that spanned four decades, Højgaard performed supporting roles in several films. According to cinema historian Morten Piils, the edgy nervousness and intensity of Højgaard's appearance prevented her from being offered lead roles in films. However, her few roles were often memorable performances, such as that of the judgmental Agnes in the darkly dramatic Danish masterpiece Café Paradis. Her final performance was in the 1972 children's film Mig og Charley. Højgaard died on 11 July 1979 at the age of 73 during a fire at her summer house on Bornholm.

Personal life
Højgaard married the businessman Anders Christian Emil Højgaard on 14 December 1926, however they divorced less than two years later. She married a second time in 1939 with shoe manufacturer Willy Johannes Madsen. Later, she married the violinist and choir director Henrik Reinholdt Sachsenskjold, but that marriage also ended in divorce. Højgaard was the half-sister to Danish stage director Søren Melson and sister-in-law of Gull-Maj Norin.

Filmography

References

External links

Else Højgaard in the National Filmography at the Danish Film Institute (in Danish)

Danish film actresses
Danish ballerinas
1906 births
1979 deaths
Knights First Class of the Order of the Dannebrog
People from Bornholm
Deaths from fire
Accidental deaths in Denmark
20th-century Danish actresses
20th-century Danish ballet dancers